The 27th Michigan Infantry Regiment was an infantry regiment that served in the Union Army during the American Civil War.

Service
The 27th Michigan Infantry was mustered into Federal service at Port Huron,  Ovid, and Ypsilanti, Michigan, on April 10, 1863.

The regiment was mustered out of service on July 26, 1865.

Total strength and casualties
The regiment suffered 10 officers and 215 enlisted men who were killed in action or mortally wounded and 3 Officers and 204 enlisted men who died of disease, for a total of 432
fatalities.

Commanders
 Colonel Byron M. Cutcheon
 Colonel Charles Waite

See also
List of Michigan Civil War Units
Michigan in the American Civil War

Notes

References
The Civil War Archive
Record of the 27th Michigan Infantry in the Civil War 1861-1865 v.27

Units and formations of the Union Army from Michigan
1865 disestablishments in Michigan
1863 establishments in Michigan
Military units and formations established in 1863
Military units and formations disestablished in 1865